Captain Robert McNair Wilson MB, ChB (22 May 1882 Maryhill, Glasgow – 29 November 1963 New Forest, Hampshire), was a British surgeon, writer and journalist and Liberal Party politician.

Background
Wilson was the son of William Wilson and Helen Turner. He was educated at Glasgow Academy and Glasgow University. On 7 December 1905 in Alnwick, Northumberland he married Winifred Paynter. They had three sons. He then married Doris May Fischel. They had two sons.

Professional career
Wilson was House Surgeon Glasgow Western Infirmary. He was Medical Correspondent of the Times from 1914–1942. He also wrote detective fiction under the pseudonym of Anthony Wynne and a novel under the pseudonym Harry Colindale.

Written as R McNair Wilson
 The Hearts of Man (1918)
 The Beloved Physician: Sir James Mackenzie, a Biography (1926)
 Napoleon the Man (1927)
 Josephine, the Portrait of a Woman (1930)
 The History of Medicine (1930)
 The King of Rome (1932)
 Monarchy or Money Power (1933)
 Napoleon's Mother (1933)
 Napoleon's Love Story (1933)
 High Finance (1934)
 The Gipsy Queen of Paris. Being the Story of Madame Tallien by Whom Robespierre Fell (1934)
 Young Man's Money (1934)
 The Mind of Napoleon (1934)
 Promise to Pay: An Inquiry Into the Modern Magic Called High Finance (1934)
 The Defeat of Debt (1935)
 Women of the French Revolution (1936)
 Germaine J de Stael, the Woman of Affairs (1936)
 Napoleon, the Portrait of a King (1937)
 Two Kinds of Money (1937)
 Doctors' Progress (1938)
 British Medicine (1941)
 The Witness of Science (1942)
 Financial Freedom for Housing (1945)
 The Empress Josephine (1952)

Written as by Anthony Wynne

Novels and Short Story Collections
The Mystery of the Evil Eye (1925). Also published as The Sign of Evil. Serialised weekly in Flynn's between 29 November 1924 and 3 January 1925
The Double-Thirteen Mystery (1926). Also published as The Double Thirteen. Serialised weekly in Flynn's between 5 and 26 September 1925
The Mystery of the Ashes (1927). Serialised weekly in Hull Times between 2 October 1926 and [Date not yet confirmed]. Also serialised weekly in Flynn's between 20 November and 11 December 1926, as Tiger's Spring
The Horseman of Death (1927). Serialised in Flynn's, 17 and 24 September, 1, 8 and 15 1927
Sinners Go Secretly (1927). Short stories
The Dagger (1928)
 Red Scar (1928)
The Fourth Finger (1929)
The Room with the Iron Shutters (1929)
The Blue Vesuvius (1930)
The Yellow Crystal (1930). Abridged and reprinted as The Face of the Assassin in Illustrated Magazine, May 1930
Murder of a Lady (1931). Also published as The Silver Scale Mystery
The Silver Arrow (1931). Also published as The White Arrow
The Case of the Green Knife (1932). Also published as The Green Knife
The Case of the Red-Haired Girl (1932). Also published as The Cotswold Case
Murder in Thin Air (1932)
The Case of the Gold Coins (1933)
The Loving Cup (1933). Also published as Death out of the Night
Death of a Banker (1934)
The Holbein Mystery (1935). Also published as The Red Lady (1935)
The Toll-House Murder (1935)
Death of a Golfer (1937). Also published as Murder in the Morning
Death of a King (1938). Also published as Murder Calls Dr Hailey
Door Nails Never Die (1939)
The House on the Hard (1940)
Emergency Exit (1941). Abridged and reprinted in Speed Mystery, March 1946
Murder in a Church (1942)
Death of a Shadow (1950)

Short Stories
The Death Moth. Hutchinson's, December 1924. Reprinted Flynn's, 25 April 1925
The Moving Hands Mystery. Hutchinson's, January 1925. Reprinted as The Movable Hands. Flynn's, 7 February 1925
The Lonely Skipper. Hutchinson's, February 1925. Reprinted Flynn's, 28 March 1925
The Mark of the Chain. Hutchinson's, March 1925. Reprinted Flynn's, 9 May 1925
The House of Death. Flynn's, 14 March 1925
Monte Carlo Madness. Flynn's, 21 March 1925. Reprinted Hutchinson's, April 1925
The Adventures of Dr Eustace Hailey: 1 - The Hat of the Hundred Days. Hull Times, 3 October 1925. Reprinted as The Hat of Elba. Flynn's, 27 February 1926
The Revolving Death. Flynn's, 10 October 1925
The Adventures of Dr Eustace Hailey: 2 - The Leather Wallet. Hull Times, 10 October 1925. Reprinted Flynn's, 26 December 1925
The Adventures of Dr Eustace Hailey: 3 - The Emerald Necklace. Hull Times, 17 October 1925. Reprinted Flynn's, 19 December 1925
The Wasp on the Window. Flynn's, 17 October 1925. Reprinted as The Adventures of Dr Eustace Hailey: 12 - The Wasp on the Window. Hull Times, 19 December 1925
The Lost Ancestor. Flynn's, 24 October 1925. Reprinted as The Adventures of Dr Eustace Hailey: 10 - The Lost Ancestor. Hull Times, 5 December 1925
The Adventures of Dr Eustace Hailey: 4 - The Acid Test. Hull Times, 24 October 1925. Reprinted Flynn's, 5 December 1925
The Adventures of Dr Eustace Hailey: 5 - Moon Metal. Hull Times, 31 October 1925. Reprinted Flynn's, 12 December 1925
The Heel of Achilles. Flynn's, 31 October 1925. Reprinted as The Adventures of Dr Eustace Hailey: 9 - The Heel of Achilles. Hull Times, 28 November 1925
Black Magic. Flynn's, 7 November 1925. Reprinted as The Adventures of Eustace Hailey: 8 - Black Magic. Hull Times, 21 November 1925
The Adventures of Dr Eustace Hailey: 6 - Countess Xaxa. Hull Times, 7 November 1925. Reprinted Flynn's, 21 November 1925, as Who is the Countess?
The Adventures of Dr Eustace Hailey: 7 - The Livid Streak. Hull Times, 14 November 1925. Reprinted Flynn's, 28 November 1925
Murder's Sting. Flynn's, 14 November 1925. Reprinted as The Adventures of Dr Eustace Hailey: 11 - The Sting. Hull Times, 12 December 1925
The Adventures of Dr Eustace Hailey: 13 - Shadows. Hull Times, 26 December 1925
Footsteps. Flynn's, 9 January 1926. Reprinted Hutchinson's, August 1926. Collected in Sinners Go Secretly
The Dancing Girl. Flynn's, 23 January 1926. Reprinted Hutchinson's, May 1926. Collected in Sinners Go Secretly
Hearts Are Trumps. Flynn's, 30 January 1926. Reprinted Hutchinson's, March 1926. Collected in Sinners Go Secretly
The Cyprian Bees. Flynn's, 6 February 1926. Reprinted Hutchinson's, April 1926. Collected in Sinners Go Secretly
The Gold of Tso-Fu. Flynn's, 13 February 1926. Reprinted Hutchinson's, September 1926. Collected in Sinners Go Secretly
The Wizard's Race. Flynn's, 6 March 1926
The Tinkle of the Bells. Hutchinson's, June/July 1926. Collected in Sinners Go Secretly
The Light on the Roof. Flynn's, 11 June 1927. Reprinted Hutchinson's, October 1927. Collected in Sinners Go Secretly
The Jewels of Yvonne. Flynn's, 25 June 1927. Collected in Sinners Go Secretly
Prudence and the Marquis. Flynn's, 2 July 1927. Collected in Sinners Go Secretly
The Telephone Man. Flynn's, 9 July 1927. Collected in Sinners Go Secretly
The House in the Woods. Hutchinson's, February 1927. Reprinted Flynn's, 27 August 1927. Collected in Sinners Go Secretly
The Black Kitten. Hutchinson's, January 1927. Reprinted Flynn's, 22 October 1927. Collected in Sinners Go Secretly

Radio plays
 The Tinkle of the Glass. BBC 5PL, Plymouth, 30 May 1927

Non-fiction
 Making Modern Girls Happier: Amateur Acting Cure for Temperamental Women. Sunday Mirror, 25 January 1925
 Shingling and Woman's Moods: New Outlook Expressed by Hair-Cutting Fashions. Sunday Mirror, 12 April 1925
 How Modern Woman Is Spoiled: English Husbands Follow America's Bad Example. Sunday Mirror, 19 July 1925
 Holiday Girls' New Heroine: Choice of Books as Sign of Changing Mind. Sunday Pictorial, 19 July 1925
 Youths Who Are Rude to Women. Sunday Mirror, 24 January 1926
 Within the Dance. Nottingham Journal, 4 March 1926. Reprinted as The Whirl. Birmingham Daily Gazette, 20 May 1926
 Fashion as Fairy Godmother. Sunday Mirror, 26 December 1926

Written as by Harry Colindale
They Want Their Wages (1925)

Political career
Wilson was Liberal candidate for the Saffron Walden division of Essex at the 1922 General Election. At this election the Liberal Party was split between followers of H. H. Asquith and followers of David Lloyd George. Wilson was a follower of Asquith, but in Saffron Waldon, he was competing with a follower of Lloyd George and as a result finished fourth. By the time of the next election in 1923, the Liberals were united and he was the only Liberal standing in Saffron Walden. He increased the Liberal vote share but only finished third. He did not stand for parliament again.

Electoral record

References

External links
 

1882 births
1963 deaths
Alumni of the University of Glasgow
Liberal Party (UK) parliamentary candidates
People educated at the Glasgow Academy